Mart Independent School District is a public school district based in Mart, Texas (USA).

Located in McLennan County, a portion of the district extends into Limestone and Falls counties.

In 2009, the school district was rated "academically acceptable" by the Texas Education Agency.

Schools
Mart High School (Grades 9-12)
Mart Middle School (Grades 5–8)
Mart Elementary School (Grades PK-4)

References

External links
Mart ISD

School districts in McLennan County, Texas
School districts in Limestone County, Texas
School districts in Falls County, Texas